Roddickton-Bide Arm is a town located in the northern peninsula of the island of Newfoundland within the province of Newfoundland and Labrador. It was formed on January 1, 2009 through the amalgamation of the former towns of Roddickton and Bide Arm.

Demographics 

See also 
List of communities in Newfoundland and Labrador
Bide Arm, former town
Roddickton, former town
Newfoundland and Labrador Route 432

References

External links 

Roddickton - Encyclopedia of Newfoundland and Labrador, vol. 4, p. 618-619.
Bide Arm - Encyclopedia of Newfoundland and Labrador, vol. 1, p. 187.

Populated coastal places in Canada
Towns in Newfoundland and Labrador
Fishing communities in Canada